Campohermoso is a town and municipality in the Colombian Department of Boyacá, part of the subregion of the Lengupá Province.

Climate
Campohermoso has a tropical monsoon climate (Köppen Am) with moderate rainfall from December to March and heavy to very heavy rainfall in the remaining months.

References

Municipalities of Boyacá Department